First Lady of Cuba is de facto title of the wife of the President of the Republic of Cuba. The current first lady of Cuba is Lis Cuesta Peraza, the second wife of President Miguel Díaz-Canel, who is also the First Secretary of the Communist Party of Cuba, the most senior position in the Cuban government. She is the first presidential wife to be referred to as "first lady" by Cuban state media since the 1960s.

History
The term "First Lady of Cuba" was first used as far back as 1913 to refer to the wife of the Cuban president. The role of first lady is purely ceremonial, and the first ladies since the Cuban Revolution hold little official influence on the politics of Cuba. Although the wife of the president of Cuba is referred to unofficially as the "first lady", it is used in state ceremonies, protocol events, and international tours. However, no official government position currently exists, particularly since the Cuban Revolution, when the term was largely eliminated by the Castro brothers.

The position was regarded as a "remnant of capitalism" and fell into disuse during the rule of Fidel Castro. Castro and his first wife,  Mirta Díaz-Balart, had divorced before the 1959 Cuban Revolution, which contributed to the decline of the role as well, according to Cuban writer, Wendy Guerra. However, Vilma Espín, Castro's sister-in-law and wife of Raúl Castro, took on the role of "Cuba's low-key first lady" for 45-years, even after Fidel Castro reportedly married Dalia Soto de Valle in 1980. Dalia Soto de Valle was not seen publicly until Pope John Paul II's visit to Cuba in January 1998. 

In recent years, the concept of a national first lady has been revived under President Miguel Díaz-Canel and his wife, Lis Cuesta.
In 2018, Cuesta became the first woman to be publicly referred to as "first lady" by some of Cuba's state-controlled broadcasters and other media outlets since the 1960s, while other state-run newspapers initially ignored her new role. Lis Cuesta Peraza was previously the Second Lady of the Republic of Cuba from the February 24, 2013, to April 19, 2018, during her husband's term as First Vice President of Cuba.  As Second Lady of Cuba, she accompanied her husband on state tours to Angola, Laos, Vietnam, Chile, Russia, among others.

The current Second Lady of the Republic of Cuba is Julia Piloto Saborit (since April 2018), the wife of the current Vice President of Cuba, Salvador Valdes Mesa.

First ladies of Cuba

First ladies of the Republic of Cuba (1902–1959)

Post Revolution (1959–Present)

References 

Cuba